"A Lesson in Leavin'", also titled as "Lesson in Leavin"', is a song written by Randy Goodrum and Brent Maher.  It was originally recorded in 1979 by American country music singer, Dottie West, for her Special Delivery album. 

Following several hit duets with Kenny Rogers including three chart-toppers, as well as many more years of solo chart action, including her top five smash "Country Sunshine" the song went to No. 1 on the Billboard Country Chart in 1980, giving West her first solo chart topper. In 1999, it was re-recorded by American country music singer, Jo Dee Messina, whose version spent seven weeks at No. 2 on the same chart.  Messina recorded the song as a tribute to West who died in 1991.

Content
Both versions of "A Lesson in Leavin'" are set at a mid-beat tempo. The song discusses how a woman is angry that her male lover has left her. She hopes that the man's next lover treats him the way the woman was treated, saying that he will be given "a lesson in leavin'."

Dottie West version
Dottie West was the first singer to release the song as a single and titled it "A Lesson in Leavin'". West's version was recorded in country pop style that was apparent on most her singles in the 1980s.
West's version peaked at No. 1 on the Hot Country Singles & Tracks chart the week of April 26, 1980, and was her first No. 1 hit as a solo artist, along with another No. 1 single shortly afterwards titled, "Are You Happy Baby?."
In addition the single was reached No. 73 on the Billboard Hot 100 and was a minor hit on the Hot Adult Contemporary Tracks chart.
The song helped to revitalize West's career, after having a series of unsuccessful solo singles in the 1970s. The song helped West endure popularity during the early 1980s.

Peak chart positions

Year-end charts

Jo Dee Messina version

Jo Dee Messina released a cover of West's original "A Lesson in Leavin'", but retitled the song, "Lesson in Leavin'". The song was released in 1999 as the fourth single from Messina's second album, 1998's I'm Alright. The song was a major hit in 1999, spending seven weeks at No. 2 on the Billboard Hot Country Singles & Tracks chart that summer.

Peak chart positions
"Lesson in Leavin'" debuted at number 56 on the U.S. Billboard Hot Country Singles & Tracks for the week of May 1, 1999.

Year-end charts

Certifications

References

1980 singles
1999 singles
Dottie West songs
Jo Dee Messina songs
Songs written by Randy Goodrum
Song recordings produced by Larry Butler (producer)
Song recordings produced by Byron Gallimore
Song recordings produced by Tim McGraw
United Artists Records singles
Curb Records singles
Songs written by Brent Maher
1979 songs